Live and Kickin' is a 2003 live album by country singer Willie Nelson, featuring music stars of diverse genres like Eric Clapton, Shania Twain, Elvis Costello, Diana Krall, Norah Jones, Ray Charles and Steven Tyler.

Track listing 
 "I Didn't Come Here (And I Ain't Leavin')" (Scotty Emerick, Michael Smotherman) - 3:12
 "Night Life" (Walt Breeland, Paul Buskirk, Willie Nelson) - 4:32
duet with Eric Clapton
 "Blue Eyes Crying in the Rain" (Fred Rose) - 2:55
duet with Shania Twain
 "Homeward Bound" (Paul Simon) - 3:57
duet with Paul Simon
 "Beer for My Horses" (Emerick, Toby Keith) - 3:33
duet with Toby Keith
 "Crazy" (Nelson) - 4:35
duet with Diana Krall and Elvis Costello
 "To All the Girls I've Loved Before" (Hal David, Albert Hammond) - 4:25
duet with Wyclef Jean
 "The Wurlitzer Prize" (Bobby Emmons, Chips Moman) - 2:30
duet with Norah Jones
 "She Loves My Automobile" (Frank Beard, Billy Gibbons, Dusty Hill) - 2:40
duet with ZZ Top
 "Angel Flying Too Close to the Ground" (Nelson) - 4:37
duet with Shelby Lynne
 "A Song for You" (Leon Russell) - 5:22
duet with Ray Charles
 "I Couldn't Believe It Was True" (Eddy Arnold, Wally Fowler) - 2:53
duet with John Mellencamp
 "Last Thing I Needed First Thing This Morning" (Donna Farar, Gary P. Nunn) - 4:33
duet with Kenny Chesney
 "Run That by Me One More Time" (Fred Foster, Arthur Hancock, Jimmy Lambert) - 2:34
duet with Ray Price
 "One Time Too Many" (Richard Supa, Steven Tyler) - 5:30
duet with Steven Tyler

Personnel 

 Robert Aaron - Keyboards
 Kenny Aronoff - Drums
 Frank Beard- Drums on "She Loves My Automobile" 
 Ray Charles - Piano and Vocals on "A Song For You"
 Kenny Chesney - Duet Vocals on "Last Thing I Needed First Thing This Morning"
 Cory Churko - Background vocals
 Eric Clapton - Duet Vocals on "Night Life"
 Dane Clark - Drums
 Elvis Costello - Vocals on "Crazy"
 Dan Dugmore - Steel Guitar
 Stuart Duncan - Fiddle
 Shannon Forrest - Percussion
 Billy Gibbons - Electric Guitar and Lead Vocals on "She Loves My Automobile"
 Donald Guillaume - Drums
 Dusty Hill - Bass guitar and Background Vocals on "She Loves My Automobile"
 John Hobbs - Keyboards
 Wyclef Jean - Acoustic Guitar and Duet Vocals on "To All the Girls I've Loved Before"
 Norah Jones - Duet Vocals on "The Wurlitzer Prize"
 Toby Keith - Duet Vocals on "Beer for My Horses"
 Diana Krall - Vocals on "Crazy"
 Shelby Lynne - Duet Vocals on Angel Flying Too Close to the Ground"
 Brent Mason - Electric Guitar
 John Mellencamp - Duet Vocals on "I Couldn't Believe It Was True"
 Willie Nelson - Acoustic Guitar, Lead Vocals
 Ray Price - Duet Vocals on "Run That by Me One More Time"
 Mickey Raphael - Harmonica
 Michael Rhodes - Bass guitar
 Matt Rollings - Keyboards
 Leon Russell - Vocals on "A Song For You", "I Can't Believe It Was True", and "Last Thing I Needed First Thing This Morning"
 Paul Simon - Duet Vocals on "Homeward Bound"
 Mirium Sturm - Violin
 Shania Twain - Duet Vocals on "Blue Eyes Crying in the Rain"
 Steven Tyler - Duet Vocals on "One Time Too Many"
 Julia Waters - Background Vocals
 Maxine Willard Waters - Background Vocals
 Biff Watson - Acoustic Guitar, Electric Guitar
 Andy York - Electric Guitar

Charts

Weekly charts

Year-end charts

References

Albums produced by James Stroud
2003 live albums
Willie Nelson live albums
Lost Highway Records live albums